Star Trek: The Motion Picture. A Novel is a 1979 novelization of the film Star Trek: The Motion Picture, which was released in the same year. It is especially notable for being the only Star Trek novel to be written by Gene Roddenberry, who created the franchise. It was also the first Star Trek novel published by Pocket Books, beginning a prolific relationship with the franchise that continues as of 2021. At the time the book was published, however, Bantam Books held the rights to publish original Star Trek-based fiction; Pocket Books wouldn't publish its first original Trek novel until 1981.

This book is sometimes erroneously credited to Alan Dean Foster; however, Foster only contributed to the film's story. The novelization based on the screenplay was written solely by Roddenberry.

Plot summary
The original historic 5-year mission is over. All of the Enterprises original crew have pursued other jobs, only to be called back into action. The USS Enterprise has been refitted and the original crew must deal with an incredibly destructive power that threatens the Earth and the human race.

Primary differences between the film and the novel
Admiral James Kirk (whose middle name is Tiberius, because that emperor fascinated Kirk's grandfather, Samuel), while at the Egypt-Israeli Museum at Alexandria, receives an emergency call via a secretive (there is a footnote of the Mind Control Revolts of 2043–47, against implants) head-implant transceiver, where he sees the Klingon's new D7 (K't'inga-class) battle cruisers being attacked.

Spock, after the five-year mission, has returned to his homeworld of Vulcan and is undergoing the Kolinahr discipline under the Vulcan Masters on the high plateau of Gol, the planet's most sacred site. Spock decides to purge his memories of the human race's existence in what he has considered the former mission to be mistake against his own Vulcan-race mastery. As Master T'sai begins to perform her mind-meld with him, his thoughts are struck at having been scanned by a consciousness, and reacted with fear for the planet Earth and its inhabitants. While no association to moons are made, the plural term, suns rising, is mentioned.

Kirk transfers to the Mediterranean Alliance's mid-21st-century-constructed hydroelectric dam, which has reclaimed the Med Basin, and speaks via 'holocom' to his former year-long spouse, Starfleet flag officer Vice Admiral Lori Ciana (also revealed to be the second of the two victims in the transporter accident, along with Commander Sonak). She was played by Susan J. Sullivan in the film. Ciana, having informed the Admiral that Commanding Admiral Heihachiro Nogura, in a pending emergency, was assembling as many of Kirk's former crew as possible to report to the Enterprise, the only starship in range, now in dry-dock for the past three years, having completed its five-year mission. Shocked that Heihachiro would use his former spouse to attempt to placate him with this news, Kirk takes the tube from Gibraltar to Los Angeles Island, where he catches the first northbound airtram for a twenty-minute flight to the San Francisco headquarters. (Some detailed actual quotes are revealed from the 12 minute conversation.)

The orbital Centroplex is where Kirk took command of the Enterprise nearly nine years earlier, and is also the largest tender facility this side of Antares. Sulu and Uhura (a Bantu of Swahili culture) have both become lieutenant commanders, Chekov, who has recently returned from weapons-defence command school, is now a full lieutenant, while Chapel is an M.D. Dr. Leonard McCoy had become reclusive over the three-year hiatus, researching applications of Fabrini medicine on Earth. Starfleet had provided Daystrom equipment which uses Fabrini symbols.

The Deltan race are revealed to be sexually irresistible. (Ilia shaved her head in an attempt to be less appealing.) Decker has sex with the Ilia probe in an attempt to join minds and connect with this alien intruder.

Throughout the novel, a phonetic spelling for "V'Ger" as Vejur is consistently used by Roddenberry, which starts when the "Ilia-Probe" is asked by Captain Kirk about the origin of "her" programming.

References

1979 American novels
Motion Picture (novel)
Novels based on films
Works by Gene Roddenberry
Pocket Books books